Mufti Nurunnessa Khatun Sylheti: ꠝꠥꠚꠔꠤ ꠘꠥꠞꠥꠘ꠆ꠘꠦꠍꠣ ꠈꠣꠔꠥꠘ (31 December 1939 – 4 December 1997) was a Bangladeshi writer, academic, and botanist.

Early life
Khatun was born on 31 December 1939 in Sylhet, Assam, British Raj. She lived in Shillong during her childhood. In 1947 she moved to Sylhet, the same year Sylhet was joined to East Bengal to become part of the future state of Pakistan through the Sylhet referendum. She graduated from Government Girls' School in Sylhet in 1953. She graduated from Murari Chand College after completing her ISc and BSc. She did her MSc in Mycology and Phytopathology from the University of Dhaka.

Career
She taught briefly in Quaid-e-Azam College, Dhaka and Women's College, Sylhet. In 1967, she joined Murari Chand College in Sylhet and in 1967 she became an assistant professor in Jagannath College. She went to England for further studies and graduated in 1971 with a MSc from the University of Liverpool. She became a member of the Royal National Rose Society in England. She then taught at Eden Girls' College and from 1973 to 1975 she taught in Begum Badrunnessa Mohila College. She was promoted to the head of the Departments of Botany and Zoology in 1975 at Begum Badrunnessa Mohila College, a position she held till 1981. The same year she founded Bangladesh National Rose Society. She organized rose exhibitions in Bangladesh and helped establish Floriculture in the country. In 1992 she joined Khulna Mohila College as Vice-Principal and professor of Botany. She retired the same year due to health reasons. She was a lifelong member of Bangladesh Botanical Society. She wrote a book about roses, Golap.

Death
Khatun died on 4 December 1997.

References

1939 births
1997 deaths
Bangladeshi women novelists
People from Sylhet District
University of Dhaka alumni
Alumni of the University of Liverpool
Academic staff of Jagannath University
Bangladeshi botanists
Indian women novelists
20th-century Indian women writers
20th-century Indian novelists
Novelists from Meghalaya
Women writers from Meghalaya
People from Shillong
Murari Chand College alumni
Academic staff of Eden Mohila College